Lukovit Municipality is a municipality (obshtina) in Lovech Province, Central-North Bulgaria, located from the Fore-Balkan area to the southern parts of Danubian Plain. It is named after its administrative centre - the town of Lukovit.

The west operating part of Hemus motorway is planned to continue through the area linking the province centre Lovech.

Settlements 

Lukovit Municipality includes the following 12 places (towns are shown in bold):

Demography 
The following table shows the change of the population during the last four decades. Since 1992 Lukovit Municipality has comprised the former municipality of Dermantsi and the numbers in the table reflect this unification.

Religion 
According to the latest Bulgarian census of 2011, the religious composition, among those who answered the optional question on religious identification, was the following:

See also
Provinces of Bulgaria
Municipalities of Bulgaria
List of cities and towns in Bulgaria

References

External links
 Official website 

Municipalities in Lovech Province